Spruce Street YMCA is a historic YMCA building located at Winston-Salem, Forsyth County, North Carolina.  It was built in 1927, and is a four-story, brick and limestone building in the Classical Revival style. The front facade features pilasters with Corinthian order capitals and two entrances with arched openings.  The building house a YMCA until 1976.

It was listed on the National Register of Historic Places in 1984.

References

Clubhouses on the National Register of Historic Places in North Carolina
Neoclassical architecture in North Carolina
Buildings and structures completed in 1927
Buildings and structures in Winston-Salem, North Carolina
National Register of Historic Places in Winston-Salem, North Carolina
YMCA buildings in the United States